Matthew Leroy Kelsh (October 4, 1904 – August 8, 1991) was an American football player.

Kelsh was born in 1904 in Dougherty, Iowa, and Dougherty High School. He played college football as a halfback for the University of Iowa from 1927 to 1929. He was declared ineligible in October 1929 for having participated in a professional game.

Kelsh then played professional football in the National Football League (NFL) as an end  for the Brooklyn Dodgers in 1930. He appeared in two NFL games.

Kelsh died in 1991 in Owatonna, Minnesota.

References

Iowa Hawkeyes football players
Brooklyn Dodgers (NFL) players
Players of American football from Iowa
1904 births
1991 deaths